The Chagres National Park is a nature park and protected area created in 1986 located between the Province of Panama and Colon, in the Eastern sector of the Panama Canal with a total surface area of .

The park contains tropical rain forests and a set of rivers which provide sufficient water to guarantee the operation of the Gatun Lake, main lake of the Panama Canal: the Chagres River and the Gatun River.

The highest point of the park is Cerro Jefe, at 1,007 m above sea level.  

It is considered a Key Biodiversity Area of international significance.

Panama Canal Watershed
The park was created in 1985, with the aim of preserving the natural forest that composes it 
 to produce water in amount and quality sufficient to guarantee the normal operation of the Panama Canal
 to supply potable water for the cities of Panama, Colon and la Chorrera,
 and the generation of electricity for the cities of Panama and Colon.

References

National parks of Panama
Protected areas established in 1985
Panamá Province
Colón Province
Tourist attractions in Colón Province
Tourist attractions in Panamá Province
1985 establishments in Panama